AZD0328 is an experimental drug.  It is a selective α7 nicotinic receptor agonist that enhances cortical dopamine release and improves learning and attentional processes in rats.

References 

Analgesics
Nicotinic agonists
Pyridines